Moscona is a surname. Notable people with the surname include:

 Anne Moscona, American pediatrician and virologist, daughter of Aron
 Aron Moscona (1921–2009), Israeli-born American developmental biologist, father of Anne
 Myriam Moscona (born 1955), Mexican writer
 Nicola Moscona (1907–1975), Greek operatic bass
Moscona may also refer to:

 Moscona (horse), a Chilean racehorse